HCG 87 is a compact group of galaxies listed in the Hickson Compact Group Catalogue.  This group is about 400 million light-years away  in the constellation Capricornus. 
The group distinguishes itself as one of the most compact groups of galaxies, hosting two active galactic nuclei and a starburst among its three members, all of which show signs of interaction. This interaction, which astronomers have called visually, and scientifically, intriguing is being examined to understand the influence of active nuclei on star formation histories.

Members

External links
Astronomy Picture of the Day
Galaxy Group HCG 87 – 2003 July 31
HCG 87: A Small Group of Galaxies – 2010 July 6 
Close-ups of HCG 87
Galactic Clusters
Studies of Hickson Compact Groups

References

87
Galaxy clusters
Capricornus (constellation)